Horní Počaply is a municipality and village in Mělník District in the Central Bohemian Region of the Czech Republic. It has about 1,200 inhabitants.

Administrative parts
The village of Křivenice is an administrative part of Horní Počaply.

Geography
It lies in a flat landscape of the Lower Eger Table. The municipality is situated on the left bank of the Elbe River.

History
The first written mention of Horní Počaply is in a deed of King Wenceslaus II from 1288. The village was divided into two parts and one was part of the Dolní Beřkovice estate from 1465, the other belonged to the Horní Beřkovice estate. This lasted until 1850, when an independent municipality was established.

Transport
Horní Počaply is located on the railway line from Prague to Ústí nad Labem.

Sights
The landmark of Horní Počaply is the Church of the Assumption of the Virgin Mary. It was originally a Gothic church from the 13th or 14th century, rebuilt in the neo-Gothic style in 1869–1871.

References

External links

Villages in Mělník District